Zhejiang cuisine, alternatively known as Zhe cuisine, is one of the Eight Culinary Traditions of Chinese cuisine. Zhejiang cuisine contains four different styles, Hangzhou, Shaoxing, Ningbo, and Wenzhou (also known as Ou cuisine). It derives from the traditional ways of cooking in Zhejiang Province, which is located south of Shanghai and centred around Hangzhou, a historical Chinese capital. In general, Zhejiang cuisine is not greasy but has a fresh and soft flavour with a mellow fragrance.

Styles
Zhejiang cuisine consists of at least three styles, each originating from a major city in the province:

 Hangzhou style: Characterised by rich variations and the use of bamboo shoots. It is served in restaurants such as the Dragon Well Manor.
 Shaoxing style: Specialising in poultry and freshwater fish.
 Ningbo style: Specialising in seafood, with emphasis on freshness and salty dishes.

Some sources also include the Wenzhou style (Ou cuisine) as a separate subdivision due to its proximity to Fujian Province. Wenzhou style is characterised as the greatest source of seafood as well as poultry and livestock.

Notable dishes

Ningbo cuisine is regarded as rather salty. Ningbo confectioneries were celebrated all over China during the Qing dynasty.

References

Regional cuisines of China
Zhejiang